August 30 - Eastern Orthodox liturgical calendar - September 1

All fixed commemorations below celebrated on September 13 by Eastern Orthodox Churches on the Old Calendar.

For August 31st, Orthodox Churches on the Old Calendar commemorate the Saints listed on August 18.

Saints

 Holy 7 Virgin-martyrs, at Gaza, by the sword.
 Holy 4 Martyrs, at Perge in Pamphylia, by fire.
 Holy 366 Martyrs, at Nicomedia, by the sword.
 Martyr Phileortus, by the sword.
 Martyrs Menas, Faustus, Andrew and Heraclius.  (see also: July 12)
 Saint Diadochos. 
 Saint Gennadius, Patriarch of Constantinople (471)  (see also: November 17 )

Pre-Schism Western saints

 Hieromartyr Cyprian, Bishop of Carthage (258)
 Martyrs Caesidius and Companions, on the shores of Lake Fucino in Italy (3rd century)
 Martyrs Robustian and Mark, venerated in Milan in Italy from early times.
 Saint Paulinus, Bishop of Trier (358)
 Saint Optatus, Bishop of Auxerre in France (c. 530)
 Saint Barbolenus, fourth Abbot of Bobbio Abbey in Italy (c. 640)
 Saint Eanswythe (Eanswith), Abbess of Folkestone (c. 640)
 Saint Aidan, Bishop of Lindisfarne, Enlightener of Northumbria (651) 
 Saints Cuthburgh (Cuthburga) and Cwenburgh, sisters, Abbesses of Wimborne (c. 725)

Post-Schism Orthodox saints

 Saint John Prodrom, Metropolitan of Kiev (1089)
 Saint Gennadius Scholarius (Gennadius the Scholar), Patriarch of Constantinople (1372)

New martyrs and confessors

 New Hieromartyr Alexander Lyubimov, Priest, and Vladimir Dvinsky, Deacon (1918)
 New Hieromartyrs Michael Kosukhin and Myron Rzhepik, Priests (1937)
 New Hieromartyr Demetrius Smirnov (1938)
 Saint Martyrs of Jasenovac, Serbia (1941-1945)

Other commemorations

 Placing of the Honourable Cincture (Sash) of the Most Holy Theotokos (395-408)
 Restoration of the Church of the Theotokos at the Neorion (port facilities) in Constantinople (c. 920-944)
 Repose of Schema-nun Gabriela of the Holy Trinity Monastery in Kiev (1992)

Icon gallery

Notes

References

Sources
 September 13/August 31. Orthodox Calendar (PRAVOSLAVIE.RU).
 September 13 / August 31. HOLY TRINITY RUSSIAN ORTHODOX CHURCH (A parish of the Patriarchate of Moscow).
 August 31. OCA - The Lives of the Saints.
 The Autonomous Orthodox Metropolia of Western Europe and the Americas (ROCOR). St. Hilarion Calendar of Saints for the year of our Lord 2004. St. Hilarion Press (Austin, TX). p. 64.
 August 31. Latin Saints of the Orthodox Patriarchate of Rome.
 The Roman Martyrology. Transl. by the Archbishop of Baltimore. Last Edition, According to the Copy Printed at Rome in 1914. Revised Edition, with the Imprimatur of His Eminence Cardinal Gibbons. Baltimore: John Murphy Company, 1916. pp. 264–265.
 Rev. Richard Stanton. A Menology of England and Wales, or, Brief Memorials of the Ancient British and English Saints Arranged According to the Calendar, Together with the Martyrs of the 16th and 17th Centuries. London: Burns & Oates, 1892. pp. 429–432.

 Greek Sources
 Great Synaxaristes:  31 ΑΥΓΟΥΣΤΟΥ. ΜΕΓΑΣ ΣΥΝΑΞΑΡΙΣΤΗΣ.
  Συναξαριστής. 31 Αυγούστου. ECCLESIA.GR. (H ΕΚΚΛΗΣΙΑ ΤΗΣ ΕΛΛΑΔΟΣ).

 Russian Sources
  13 сентября (31 августа). Православная Энциклопедия под редакцией Патриарха Московского и всея Руси Кирилла (электронная версия). (Orthodox Encyclopedia - Pravenc.ru).
  31 августа по старому стилю / 13 сентября по новому стилю. Русская Православная Церковь - Православный церковный календарь на  год.

August in the Eastern Orthodox calendar